Disc Jockey is a 1951 American film.

Plot
A radio disc jockey is about to lose his program's sponsor because the sponsor believes that audiences are deserting radio for television. The disc jockey sets out to prove otherwise by calling on disc jockeys in major cities across the United States.

Cast
Ginny Simms as Vickie Peters
Tom Drake as Johnny
Jane Nigh as Marion
Michael O'Shea as Mike Richards
Jerome Cowan as Chris Marley
Red Nichols
Tommy Dorsey
Russ Morgan
George Shearing
Herb Jeffries as H. J. Ball
Sarah Vaughan
Nick Lucas
Foy Willing and Riders of the Purple Sage
The Weavers
Jack Fina

Production
Filming took place in May 1951.

References

External links
Disc Jockey at TCMDB
Disc Jockey at Letterbox DVD
Disc Jockey at BFI
Disc Jockey at IMDb

1951 films
1951 musical films
American musical films
Films directed by Will Jason
Allied Artists films
American black-and-white films
1950s English-language films
1950s American films